Flatbush Zombies (stylized as Flatbush ZOMBiES) is an American hip hop group from the Flatbush section of Brooklyn, New York City, formed in 2010. The group is composed of rappers Meechy Darko, Zombie Juice and Erick Arc Elliott, with Elliott also serving as their regular record producer. The trio are part of the East Coast hip hop supergroup Beast Coast, with fellow Brooklyn-based rap groups The Underachievers and Pro Era.

Flatbush Zombies have collaborated with various artists, including RZA, ASAP Mob, Z-Breezy, Jim Jones, Juicy J, Danny Brown, Action Bronson, Mr. Muthafuckin eXquire, Tech N9ne, and Anthony Flammia among others. They have performed at music festivals such as The Hudson Project, JMBLYA, Coachella Valley Music and Arts Festival, Pemberton Music Festival, Afropunk Festival, Olly Mac Sesh, Paid Dues, North Coast Music Festival, SXSW, Roskilde, Rolling Loud in Miami, and Wireless in London. The group grew in popularity through two mixtapes and several music videos, leading to their 2016 debut studio album, 3001: A Laced Odyssey.

History

Background and formation
Friends since grade school, all three members were born and raised in the Flatbush section of Brooklyn, New York City. Erick and Meechy Darko are of Jamaican descent. Demetri Simms (Meechy Darko), Antonio Lewis (Zombie Juice) and Erick Elliott (The Architect) first bonded over the Japanese anime Dragon Ball Z and wrestling. During their teenage years they began experimenting with psychedelic drugs, such as psilocybin mushrooms and LSD. Zombie Juice, along with fellow Flatbush native Issa Gold of the Underachievers (Erick did not participate), specifically started looking into the indigo lifestyle. Meechy Darko said the first time he took psilocybin mushrooms, he underwent Ego death and had a sort of rebirth of consciousness.

Mixtapes and rise in popularity (2010–2013)
Erick Arc Elliott, who had been making his own solo music, decided to bring the group together musically around 2010. Their first club performance took place in 2012, at 307 in Waterloo. The group's popularity grew after releasing the "Thug Waffle" video on YouTube. Later in the year, Flatbush Zombies released their debut mixtape, titled D.R.U.G.S., which stands for "Death and Reincarnation Under God's Supervision."  In 2012, Flatbush Zombies were featured on the song "Just Blowin' in the Wind" with Wu Tang Clan's RZA for the soundtrack to RZA's film The Man with the Iron Fists. "

In 2013, the group collaborated with fellow Brooklyn rap group the Underachievers, on the single "No Religion".

On July 29, 2013, Flatbush Zombies released a YouTube video announcing their second mixtape, BetterOffDEAD, which was released at 9:11 PM on September 11, 2013. Along with "MRAZ," the singles "Palm Trees" and "222", are included on the nineteen track mixtape BetterOffDEAD. Though Elliott is the main producer, Harry Fraud and Obey City also provide production on the mixtape. Danny Brown and Action Bronson appear on the tracks "Drug Parade" and "Club Soda" respectively. The mixtape was met with critical acclaim. It would end up being ranked at number 17 on XXLs list of the best mixtapes of 2013.  A remixed version of My Team Supreme featuring Bodega Bamz was featured in NBA Live 15. Flatbush Zombies also released the video for "MRAZ", a track off the group's mixtape BetterOffDEAD.

Clockwork Indigo and 3001: A Laced Odyssey (2014–2018)
On February 13, 2014, Flatbush Zombies released a new song, "LiT". Flatbush Zombies revealed to XXL that their EP, It's All a Matter of Perspective, had been scrapped. Instead the group told XXL to "expect an album this year."

In September 2014, it was announced that Flatbush Zombies would be touring with fellow Brooklyn-based rap group the Underachievers, and they would be collectively known as Clockwork Indigo. The two groups subsequently released a collaborative song titled "Butterfly Effect," followed by an EP titled Clockwork Indigo, on October 17, 2014. They claim that they came up with the idea of forming Clockwork Indigo, from a "strange LSD trip while watching A Clockwork Orange". During the Clockwork Indigo concert tour, the group collectively wore white clothing as did Alex's gang in the film A Clockwork Orange.

On March 15, 2015, Flatbush Zombies released a new single on SoundCloud titled "Red Eye to Paris" featuring UK Grime artist Skepta. On September 11, 2015, at 9:11 pm EST, the group released a new single and socially charged music video on YouTube titled "Blacktivist".

On January 11, 2016, the group released the single "Glorious Thugs". On the same day, the group announced that their debut album titled 3001: A Laced Odyssey, would be released March 11, 2016. On February 5, 2016, they released the first single from 3001: A Laced Odyssey titled "Bounce", followed by the official music video on February 8. On March 10, 2016, Flatbush Zombies released the second single from the album, titled "This Is It". The following day, they released the album. 3001: A Laced Odyssey received generally positive reviews from critics. At Metacritic, which assigns a normalized rating out of 100 to reviews from critics, the album received an average score of 80, based on 7 reviews. The album sold 28,000 copies in the first week, debuting at number 10 on the US Billboard 200 chart.

Vacation in Hell (2018–present)
On February 23, 2018, Flatbush Zombies released the first single off of their second studio album, Vacation in Hell. The project was released on April 6, 2018, under Glorious Dead Recordings. The album spawned a worldwide tour, See You In Hell Tour, that started off on April 14 at the 2018 Coachella Music Festival and ended on June 16. In promotion for the album, the trio appeared on the nationally syndicated talk show The Breakfast Club as well as performing freestyles for Funk Flex on his radio show.

On June 5, 2020, the group released an EP, "Now, More Than Ever", in the wake of the George Floyd protests. The project was supported by the single "Iamlegend". The EP debuted and peaked at number 168 on the Billboard 200. The group contributed a remix of the Metallica song "The Unforgiven", featuring DJ Scratch, to the charity tribute album The Metallica Blacklist, released in September 2021.

Discography

Studio albums

Collaborative albums

EPs

Mixtapes

Singles

"Day Of The Dead" releases

Guest appearances

Music videos

References

External links
 
 Flatbush Zombies on Their Psychedelic Hip-Hop ‘Odyssey’ at Rolling Stone

Hip hop groups from New York City
Musical groups established in 2010
Musical groups from Brooklyn
American musical trios
Underground hip hop groups
People from Flatbush, Brooklyn
2010 establishments in New York City